The William Allan Award, given by the American Society of Human Genetics, was established in 1961 in memory of William Allan (1881–1943), one of the first American physicians to conduct extensive research in human genetics. 

The William Allan Award is presented annually to recognize substantial and far-reaching scientific contributions to human genetics carried out over a sustained period of scientific inquiry and productivity. An award of $25,000 and an engraved medal are presented at the Annual Meeting.

Award recipients
Source:  ASHG

See also

 List of genetics awards
 List of medicine awards

References

American science and technology awards
Awards established in 1961
Genetics awards
Medicine awards